Norio is a village in Gardabani District, Kvemo Kartli, Georgia. Community Center for Villages: Norio, Upper Kvishiani, Lower Kvishiani.

Geography 
It is located east of Tbilisi, in the southern foothills of Yalnos Ridge, on a plateau between the rivers Norikhevi and Pashatrikhev, at an altitude of 820 m above sea level. It is 50 km away from Gardabani, 25 km from Tbilisi. The village is bordered by Martkopi to the east, Tbilisi Reservoir to the west, Akhali Samgori and Tsilubani to the south.

Hydro resources 
The rivers Norikhevi and Pashatrikhevi are connected with the village. To the south, they join the Martkopi and Satskhene-Akhalsopeli rivers and form the Lochini River. There are many springs in the vicinity of the village: Nephistskaro, Angel's spring, Ifni spring, Eagle spring, Nikolaant Milkhina and Milkhini branch and others. As for drinking water from the west, it is extracted from the springs of Ashkaveti, Kalamadze and Tsilubani. It flows from Nasoflar Shvindadze from the north. Near the village there is sulfur water, which comes out from the bottom of the so-called All-Holy. It was used to treat skin. There is healing mud in the forest. (At the foot of the Zaravin Pantes) Salt water also flows into the forest, which is used to knead dough and make pickles.

Flora and Fauna 
It is surrounded by deciduous forests to the north and northeast of Norio. Where we will meet oak, beech, caraway, maple and Georgia forest fruit species typical: Panta, Majalo, Balamtsara, Shout, hawthorn, Kvrinchkhi, blackthorn and in some places artificially cultivated conifers and walnuts. Forests are replaced by meadows, which are rich in herbaceous plants used by the locals to develop livestock and beekeeping.

The following species of animals inhabit the Norio forests: lynx, wolf, tortoise, fox, rabbit, roe deer, marten, Wild cat. Seniors say there were plenty of brown bear and deer in the 50s and 70s. From domestic animals the natives have bred: cows, pigs, sheep and goats. From birds: chicken, turkey, duck, goose and sisir.

History 
The presence of bronze spearheads and stone tombs discovered during archeological excavations in the Norio area indicates settlement there from the late Bronze Age, 3500–3000 years ago. The etymology of the toponym Norio itself has not been determined. In the description of the life of Anton Martkopeli, Iakob Gogebashvili mentions that Noria was called the father of the village. In ancient times, Norio's cultivation was on a steep slope on the left bank of the Norikhev River. 

During his reign, David VII of Georgia (David Ulu), fell ill with an unknown disease while defending against the Mongols at the fortifications of Derbent (Siba). He was brought to the Martqopi monastery, known as the Monastery of God (4 km away from Norio), where a church tabernacle (also known as a Zion in Eastern churches), containing the Eucharistic host was placed. In the religious tradition of the Georgian Orthodox Church, David Ulu was thus saved from death in a Eucharistic miracle. During the third invasion by Timur in 1394, his Mongol forces attacked the population of Norio-Martkopi. Even the monastics had been trained to fight. The safety of the acheiropoieton, an icon "made without hands" by the miraculous transfer from the sacred Image of Edessa, was endangered by the impending battle. It had reputedly been brought to Norio-Martkopi from Edessa in the 6th century, by Anton Martkopeli, one of the Thirteen Assyrian Fathers. Rustaveli Giorgi, Bishop of Rustavi hid the treasured icon for safety; however, he was killed in the battle with Timur's forces. The icon has not been found since that time. The Rustaveli's remains were interred within the Martqopi monastery, and transferred to Tbilisi Sioni Cathedral in 1818.

Norio is also mentioned in the "Paris Chronicles": "On the order of Mouravi" [the Mouravi being Giorgi Saakadze], "Georgians rallied and attacked Martkopi, on the night of Noria's Annunciation, at the head of the Kizilbash. Karchkha Khan Sadari and Usupkhan Shirvan Khan and the sultans were also killed".(p. 48) That is, it seems that the Norio people themselves took an active part in the battle of Martkopi. Norio was historically part of Kakheti. Kakhetia is on the border, near the village of Tbilisi and Mtskheta. After the siege of Kakheti by Shah Abbas, the invasions of the Dagestanis in eastern Georgia became more intense, especially in the 18th century, in the protection of Tbilisi from the East.

In October 1795, Martkopi, a detachment of Lekti Marbiel was going to invade Norio through the forest, they noticed a spy "Tsatura" from the Takashvili family tower. The Leks were so brave that they laid down their arms and even started swimming in the small lake there. The Norians were also helped by the Martkopi in the battle against the Leks, and they defeated a detachment of 1,500 men. D. Batonishvili writes in the new history: "They saw the impotence of the Georgians, gathered more than one thousand five hundred, came to Norio, except for a lot" [i.e except for one portion] "... Zaal Andronikashvili, who was bravely found in every part of Georgia." Zaal Andronikashvili was the mouravi of Martkopi and Norio was included in the territory of the mouravi for Martkopi. The battlefield is still called Naomi Series. The lake no longer exists, but this place is still mentioned as Nalekaristba.

There is another historical place near Norio, the so-called Narusses. 1803 This year Russian General Guliakov camped here with troops when he was going to attack the rebellious lords fortified in Martkopi (after the unification of the Kingdom of Kartli-Kakheti by Russia by the decision of the Russian emperor Bagrationi had to be deported, which was followed by an uprising).

From the 18th century the location of the village changed due to a natural disaster, which washed away the slope and affected the population. The relocation and settlement on the right bank of the river ended in the 1940s. Historian Iv. Arjevanidze in his book "From Tbilisi to Alazani Valley" points out: Before the advent of the 19th century Norio, Martkopi and Satskhenisi were crucial military fortifications on the outskirts of the city Tbilisi, Dagestan – To defend the capital city from the enemies who came from Leketi.

On 19 June 1898, the Iveria newspaper reported that shale oil was being extracted in Norio. In 1938 oil began to be extracted again. Norio shale oil is very high quality. It contains a small amount of sulfur; this property makes it unique. From this was obtained a much-needed product – Luminoflor, called "Noriola". This product was used in construction with precision tools. Norio oil is used to extract frost-based transmission oil used in the Arctic and northern regions. Oil production is currently suspended.

The people of Norio took an active part in World War I and World War II. In the center of the village, next to the House of Culture, stands a memorial to the victims of the war, where the surnames and first names of 304 Norians who could not return to the village are carved. An obelisk is erected in the school yard to commemorate the 20 students who were drafted from the school desk into the army and killed in battle. 

During the Soviet period, there was a dairy farm in the village.

Education and Culture 
There is a public school in the village with about 500 to 600 students. There is a music school in the village. There is a house of culture in the village. There is a Library and an ethnographic museum.

Folk handicrafts 

The Norians were more concerned with cultivating the land and raising livestock. Were skilled in wool weaving. The sheep were always owned by the Norians and their wool was used in this work. It was washed and sewn on a sackcloth, then hung on a knitting needle and knitted. They had wooden rectangular shawls on which the washed shawls were stretched and dried. These products were taken to Tbilisi for sale. The people of Norio, as breeders, knew how to make excellent cheese and greens, which they sold in Tbilisi. Even today, most families survive on this.

The people of Norio that they knew how to make ammunition and household items are proved by bronze spear blades, and later axes, bars, hoes, tongs for stoves and others made by local blacksmiths. The Kurashvilis were especially prominent in this case, they are still called "blacksmiths". Precious clays are mined in Norio. It was mined in the 60s and 70s. It was taken to the very spot where 1938 the first oil well was built in [1938]. The so-called "At the foot of Khuta". The clays were taken to Kazreti and used to process copper and gold. Its extraction is suspended.

Holidays

Sunday 
On the second Sunday of Easter, a Sunday service is held in Norio. There seems to be a small church at the top of the village. There is now a niche built there, named after one of the apostles Thomas (doubting Thomas). People go and light candles there. Even people who are about 30 years old and of course their elders remember that on this holiday Norians were visited by guests from Martkopi, Lilo, Gldani and other villages. Dance-games and wrestling were held in the niche, and the houses hosted guests and made them happy. Young people and their parents often choose the bride on the holiday.

Mariamoba 
In Norio, as in the whole of Georgia, 28 August is the day of the Assumption of the Virgin Mary. It is celebrated by the Norians in the monastery of the deity. Not only from nearby villages, but also from distant villages of Kakheti, people come here to pray and spend time. It was accepted here to rise on 27 August and spend the night. On 29 August, a deity is held in honor of the gloved icon. Anchiskhatoba is also celebrated on this day. The icon brought from Father Anthony is known to have been depicted on clay and was a copy of Anchiskhati. This holiday is still celebrated and on 29 August, the Catholicos Patriarch Ilia II often visits the Khvvtaebi Monastery. In 1918, when the autocephaly of the church had just been restored, the Catholicos Patriarch Kirion II Sadzaglishvili was brought to the monastery and killed on the night of 27 August.

Historical monuments 
Cultural monuments: the monastery complex of the Deity, St. George of Kharazauli, the Church of the All-Holy Mother of God, the Church of the Holy Mother of God, the Church of the Mother of God in Tablia, Gorijvari, the face of Teleti, St. George of Abraman and Mamnia, St. George, Church of the Archangel Michael and Gabriel, Greetings, Sunday, Church of St. John the Baptist, Church of the Assumption and more.

Castle 
In the center of the village, on the central road, on the right bank of the river Norikhevi, stands a large castle. The castle chronologically consists of two layers, the eastern part belongs to the 17th century, while the western was built in 1752, during the reign of King Erekle II. It is built of large cobblestones, Korean stone is also used. There are also cylindrical towers in the fence, which have an entrance from the courtyard. II
And III floors are artillery.

Deity Monastery Complex 

Near Norio stands the Martkopi Deity Monastery, founded by one of the 13 Assyrian fathers, Anton Martkopel in the 4th century. The main building of the monastery is the domed temple, which after many alterations received its final look in the 19th century. The temple is built of cut stone and is richly decorated with carvings. It is surrounded by an artillery fence. To the east of the monastery, on a mountain, stands a tower built by Anton Martofeli. Another building of the monastery is the three-storey bell tower built in 1629 by Kalatoz Akherda.

Church of the Blessed Virgin Mary 

The Church of the Blessed Virgin Mary stands in the Tsopuraant district. Its construction is connected with the name of the ancestors of Iakob Mansvetashvili. He himself tells us the following: In the 17th century in Russia was sent an eminent man on state and trade affairs with our kings. He was accompanied by a large Amala. The high temperatures are ex-and because of this Amal members have chosen a good summer residence in the village of Norio. Amali members are married to Mansvetov and Khorev by Nori women and never return to Russia. The Khoriashvilis still live at the bottom of the village. As for Mansvetov, he was a first-born (Chopura), his descendants were changed by the Norio people to the Tsopurashvilis. (I. Mansvetashvili _ Memoirs – p. 240. 2006)

The Tsopurashvilis built a family church and a tower in Norio at the end of the 18th century. The tower still stands today. As for the church, in 2003–2005 Norians changed its look, removing a small dome from the roof. They surrounded the yard with a low fence and built a bell tower. Many Norians did the work for free. The church was painted with the great contribution of a young man from Norio – Dimitri Dzidzikashvili, a student of the Art Academy. The church reopened 2005 on 28 August.

There is a small niche near the wall of the altar, where it is written: "Deacon Alexander Iakob Mansvetashvili rests here." This man was the father of the famous Iakob Mansvetasvili.

Other Churches 
In addition, there are two functioning churches in the village of Norio, which are served by a local resident – Father Kakhaber Uertashvili. One of the functioning churches is the Church of the Archangels Michael and Gabriel, it was built by the Kopilashvilis in the upper part of the village in the 19th century.

At the highest point in Norio, namely the cemetery of Zomo district, stands the Church of St. John the Baptist. It is a single-nave hall type building (8,5X5) of the late Middle Ages. It was restored and painted by Arsen Osikmashvili.

On the left bank of the river Norikhevi, northeast of Norio, lived the Mamadashvilis, who later settled on the right bank of the river. With their old settlements they have left a small type of church called Mamadant St. George. Only remnants of the church walls were recovered. It was restored in 2007 by Mamadashvili Chitana's children – Valiko, Zaur and Tariel Mamadashvili

Towers 
There are several towers in the village, including the "Tsofuraant Tower", which was built in the second half of the 17th century. It is an ancestral tower. It is located in the eastern part of the village, in the Tsopurashvili district. It has three floors. The front door is located on the first floor. The entrance to the II and III floors is embedded in the wall. "Kejeraant Tower" stands in the middle of the village. The towers were used for military and residential purposes.

"Badridzeant" tower 

The second ancestral tower is located on the right side of the road in the center of the village. The tower dates back to the 18th century. It has three floors. It is contemporaneous with the Great Fortress and the Tsopurashvili Tower. The dimensions of the first floor are 4.9 × 4 × 6 m. The first floor has no artillery. The second floor has artillery except the west. The third floor has balconies. Christesia Badridze, the builder of the tower, a resident of our village, deserves to be mentioned in a few words before her homeland, she refers to herself as Martkopel Kejerashvili. Here is why: his ancestors were Badridzes, they lived in Norio, they had received nobility. One member of their family settled in the estate of the inherited extinct Kejerashvilis and along with the family lost the degree of nobility.

Christia was a highly educated person, having cared for Jerusalem, Babylon, Egypt and others. In 1749, Erekle's printing house was rebuilt in Tbilisi, but they did not have an expert in printing. Erekle II sent him to Palestine to investigate the matter. Upon his return, an educated priest was appointed governor of the printing press. In 1783 he leased the printing press from the king on the condition that half of the profits should be deposited in the royal treasury. He was also the priest of King Erekle's gate. He is the first local private entrepreneur in Georgia in the printing industry and manufacturing in general. He knew many languages Greek and was a great help to Erekle II in his relations with the Greek craftsmen working in the Akhtala and Alaverdi ores. Specially settled Greeks worked in the copper mines and factories of Tbilisi, Akhtala and Alaverdi. Christesia's great mission was to resolve the issue of Georgians and other Christians held captive by Agha-Mohammad-Khan in the Ganja Khanate. He was able to return 700 Christian families to Georgia.

When King Erekle died, the face was raging in Mtskheta.

It is difficult to list the many merits he owes to father-son Erekle II and George XII. It was for this reason that King George restored his real surname and estates and restored his nobility. The deed of mercy was kept in the monastery library. It is currently kept in the Georgian State Museum.

His descendants say he is buried near the monastery complex of the deity, all in the courtyard of the Church of the Virgin Mary.
His descendant was the late historian Professor Shota Badridze (Searches from the History of Georgia and the Caucasus pp. 300_311_1976).

"Takaant" tower 
The third ancestral tower – the so-called Takaant Tower is located in the forest, about 3 km north of the village. The tower has three floors. It is older than other ancestral towers. It is not possible to enter it because the first floor is half buried in the ground. The Takashvili family lived here in the 19th century, and then, along with other surnames, they settled in the present settlement. This surname is one of the oldest surnames in the village. Such a surname is not found anywhere else except for the Takashvilis who settled in Norio near Saguramo. Near the tower is a small church called St. George in Takaant. It is from this tower that the Lori Tsatura will see the Leks, who were killed together by the Norians and Martkopi.

See also 
 Martkopi Deity Monastery
 Norio's Treasure
 Kvemo Kartli

Populated places in Kvemo Kartli